Luís Guilherme Cavalleri Porto (born 4 June 1997) is a Brazilian artistic gymnast and a member of the national team. He participated in the 2019 Summer Universiade, placing third in vault and 18th all-around.

External links
 FIG profile

References

1997 births
Living people
Brazilian male artistic gymnasts
South American Games gold medalists for Brazil
South American Games medalists in gymnastics
Competitors at the 2018 South American Games
Gymnasts at the 2019 Pan American Games
Pan American Games gold medalists for Brazil
Pan American Games medalists in gymnastics
Universiade medalists in gymnastics
Universiade bronze medalists for Brazil
Medalists at the 2019 Summer Universiade
Medalists at the 2019 Pan American Games
21st-century Brazilian people